The Höfle Telegram (or Hoefle Telegram) is a cryptic one-page document, discovered in 2000 among the declassified World War II archives of the Public Record Office in Kew, England.  The document consists of several radio telegrams in translation, among them a top-secret message sent by SS Sturmbannführer Hermann Höfle on 11 January 1943; one, to SS Obersturmbannführer Adolf Eichmann in Berlin, and one to SS Obersturmbannführer Franz Heim in German-occupied Kraków (Cracow).

The Telegram contains the detailed statistics on the 1942 killings of Jews in the extermination camps of Operation Reinhard including at Belzec (B), Sobibor (S), Treblinka (T), and at Lublin-Majdanek (L). The numbers were compiled and quoted by Höfle, likely from the very precise records shared with the Deutsche Reichsbahn. Even though the Holocaust railway transportation records were notoriously incomplete as revealed by the Main Commission for the Investigation of German Crimes against the Polish Nation, the quoted numbers shed a new light on the evidential standard of proof for the scope of the crimes committed by the SS. The telegram gave train arrivals in the prior fortnight, as well as cumulative arrivals until 31 December 1942, for the extermination camps during the deadliest phase of the "Final Solution".

Background

All Holocaust trains were run by the Deutsche Reichsbahn. The SS paid German Railways the equivalent of a third class ticket for every prisoner transported via the Holocaust trains (Sonderzüge) to the extermination camps of Operation Reinhard from Ghettos in Nazi-occupied Europe and Jewish ghettos in German-occupied Poland. Children under four went free. The payment was collected from the SS by the German Transport Authority on behalf of the Reichsbahn according to a schedule, at a cost of 4 Pfennig per track kilometer. The actual waybills did not include the number of prisoners in each cattle car because calculations were predetermined. The standard means of delivery was a 10 metre long covered goods wagon, although third class passenger carriages were also used with train tickets paid by the Jews themselves, when the SS wanted to keep up the "resettlement to work in the East" myth. The Deutsche Reichsbahn manual, which was used by the SS for making payments, had a listed carrying capacity of each trainset setup at 50 boxcars, each loaded with 50 prisoners.

In reality, boxcars were crammed with up to 100 persons and routinely loaded from the minimum of 150% to 200% capacity for the same price. Notably, during the mass deportation of Jews from the Warsaw Ghetto to Treblinka in 1942, trains carried up to 7,000 victims each, which reduced the cost to the SS by more than half. According to an expert report established on behalf of the German "Train of Commemoration" project, the receipts taken in by the state-owned Deutsche Reichsbahn for mass deportations in the period between 1938 and 1945 reached a sum of US $664,525,820.34.

Translation
The Höfle Telegram is a decoded message, encrypted at source by the German Enigma machine. A missing "5" is added in the table, and is considered to be the correct figure, because only the number 713,555 yields the correct total of 1,274,166, and also the Korherr Report of 1943 substantiates that the total number of 1,274,166 Jews subjected to "special treatment" (Sonderbehandlung) in the General Government district of German-occupied Poland is correct to the last incongruous digit. The British decoded version of the Telegram would almost certainly be a transcription error, since British security clearly did not realise what this message was about (see above). It is unlikely that the numerical mistake would have been noticed by them at the time. Admittedly the interception and decoding was not 100% accurate (see reproduction).

Importance of the document

According to the US National Security Agency and the Holocaust historians, "it appears the British analysts who had decrypted the message missed the significance of this particular message at the time. No doubt this happened because the message itself contained only the identifying letters for the extermination camps followed by the numerical totals. The only clue would have been the reference to Operation Reinhard, the meaning of which – the plan to eliminate Polish Jewry that was named after the assassinated SS General Reinhard Heydrich – also probably was unknown at the time to the codebreakers at Bletchley."

The Höfle's radio telegram is one of two evidential proofs making use of the very precise figures, suggesting their common origin; the other one is the Korherr Report to Himmler by professional statistician Dr Richard Korherr from January 1943. Both of them quote exactly the same number of Jews "processed" during Operation Reinhard. Apart from providing identical totals as of December 31, 1942, the Höfle Telegram also indicates that the camp at Lublin (Majdanek) was part of Odilo Globocnik's Operation Reinhard, a fact that historians previously had not fully realised.

See also

 Einsatzgruppen reports, 1941–1942
 Cornides Report, 1942
 Gerstein Report, 1945
 Jäger Report, 1941
 Katzmann Report, 1943
 Korherr Report, 1943
 Riegner Telegram, 1942
 Special Prosecution Book-Poland, 1937–1939

Notes

Citations

External link

Holocaust historical documents
Operation Reinhard
1943 in international relations
Collection of The National Archives (United Kingdom)
Bletchley Park
1943 documents
Telegrams